The Journal of Economic Literature is a peer-reviewed academic journal, published by the American Economic Association, that surveys the academic literature in economics. It was established in 1963 as the Journal of Economic Abstracts, and is currently one of the highest ranked journals in economics. As a review journal, it mainly features essays and reviews of recent economic theories (as opposed to the latest research). The editor-in-chief is Steven Durlauf. In January 2022, the AEA announced that David Romer would become the editor beginning in July 2022.

The journal originated a widely used classification system for publications in the field of economics.

See also
JEL classification codes

References

External links 

Economics journals
Publications established in 1963
English-language journals
Quarterly journals
Academic journals published by learned and professional societies of the United States
American Economic Association academic journals